Sant Jaume d'Enveja is a municipality in the comarca of the Montsià in Catalonia, Spain. It is situated in the southern half of the Ebro Delta, on the right bank of the river. The municipality was created in 1978: previously the territory formed part of the municipality of Tortosa.
It is linked to Amposta by a local road, and to Deltebre on the opposite bank by a service of barges.

The town was established relatively recently in the 1860s. This is due in part to the formation of the delta over the last few centuries from the river's sedimentary deposits.

The town's economy is centred on agriculture, principally rice cultivation, along with a strong tourist industry. The tourism sector has seen an expansion in recent years based on the attractive countryside offered by the River Ebre Delta national park and its biodiversity. There is a lighthouse on the island of Buda.

Sant Jaume d'Enveja became part of the Montsià in the comarcal revision of 1990: previously it formed part of the Baix Ebre.

Villages
Balada, 10 
Els Muntells, 495 
Sant Jaume d'Enveja, 2787

References

 Panareda Clopés, Josep Maria; Rios Calvet, Jaume; Rabella Vives, Josep Maria (1989). Guia de Catalunya, Barcelona: Caixa de Catalunya.  (Spanish).  (Catalan).

External links 
Official website 
 Government data pages 

Municipalities in Montsià
Populated places in Montsià